The Automotive Researchers' and Journalists' Conference of Japan, also known as (RJC), is a non-profit organization established in 1990, consisting of Japan-based automotive critics and journalists. 

The RJC holds a yearly conference, where they bestow awards regarding:

Person of the Year (related to the automotive world)
Technology of the Year
Car of the Year (Japanese-made)
Import Car of the Year (since 2001)

RJC Car of the Year is one of the prominent Japanese automobile awards, the other being Japan Car of the Year.

Winners

See also

 List of motor vehicle awards
International Engine of the Year
PACE Award
Progressive Insurance Automotive X Prize
Ward's 10 Best Engines

External links
Official website

Japanese science and technology awards
Motor vehicle awards